The 2011 Asian Men's Club Volleyball Championship was the 12th staging of the AVC Club Championships. The tournament was held in Palembang Sport and Convention Center, Palembang, South Sumatra, Indonesia.

Pools composition
The teams are seeded based on their final ranking at the 2010 Asian Men's Club Volleyball Championship.

Preliminary round

Pool A

Pool B

Classification 9th–12th

Semifinals

11th place

9th place

Final round

Quarterfinals

5th–8th semifinals

Semifinals

7th place

5th place

3rd place

Final

Final standing

Awards
MVP:  Hamzeh Zarini (Paykan)
Best Scorer:  Daisaku Nishio (Sakai)
Best Spiker:  Mehdi Bazargard (Paykan)
Best Blocker:  Hesam Bakhsheshi (Paykan)
Best Server:  Hamzeh Zarini (Paykan)
Best Setter:  Shun Imamura (Sakai)
Best Libero:  Yusuke Inoue (Sakai)

References

External links
Asian Volleyball Confederation

2011 Asian Men's Club Volleyball Championship
Asian Men's Club Volleyball Championship
Asian Men's Club Volleyball Championship
Asian Men's Club Volleyball Championship